Donald Austin Nolander (September 14, 1921 – April 24, 1999) was an American football center in the All-America Football Conference for the Los Angeles Dons.  He played college football at the University of Minnesota and was drafted in the 32nd round of the 1945 NFL Draft by the Washington Redskins.

1921 births
1999 deaths
Players of American football from Minneapolis
American football centers
Minnesota Golden Gophers football players
Los Angeles Dons players
People from Estero, Florida